Geeth Kumara (born 15 May 1988) is a Sri Lankan cricketer. He made his first-class debut for Seeduwa Raddoluwa Cricket Club in the 2008–09 Premier Trophy on 14 November 2008. Geeth is also the club professional of Lancashire League team - Colne Cricket Club where he has also resigned for the 2023 season.

References

External links
 

1988 births
Living people
Sri Lankan cricketers
Chilaw Marians Cricket Club cricketers
Kilinochchi District cricketers
Lankan Cricket Club cricketers
Seeduwa Raddoluwa Cricket Club cricketers
Saracens Sports Club cricketers
Cricketers from Colombo